The Calgary and Edmonton Trail was a land transport route between Fort Edmonton and Fort Calgary in the Northwest Territories.

Prior to European contact, there was already a route through the area that local Indigenous peoples used to travel from the Shortgrass Prairies in the south to the Aspen Parkland in the north and back.  After a fur trade post was established at Fort Edmonton, these trails became part of the massive fur-trading transportation network that European companies used to export furs from the interior to the coasts and on to Europe. The northern portion of trail to Fort Edmonton was traveled by David Thompson in 1800.
The more modern trail was blazed by John McDougall in 1873 as far as Morley and extended to Calgary two years later.  Development of the trail allowed mail service between Calgary and Edmonton in July 1883.

Name and namesakes
Alberta Highway 2 is now the main route from Edmonton to Calgary.  Most of it bears the name "Queen Elizabeth II Highway", but some sections are named in honour of the old trail, as are other roads leading in the same direction.

Heading south from Edmonton, the trail was called "Calgary Trail". Calgary Trail now refers to the southbound portion of Highway 2 within the boundaries of the city of Edmonton.

Heading north from Calgary, the trail bore the name "Edmonton Trail". That name now refers to a north–south feeder road in Calgary approximately 1 km west of the current Highway 2 and approximately 0.25 km east of Centre Street North. A segment of the old trail through the city of Airdrie is also called Edmonton Trail.

See also
Calgary and Edmonton Railway

References

History of Alberta
Historic trails and roads in Alberta
District of Alberta
Pre-Columbian trails and roads